Stranton is an area of south Hartlepool in the borough of Hartlepool, County Durham, England. It is a former village and parish.

The ancient parish boundaries were the North Sea to the east, Greatham Creek, an arm of the Tees, to the south, the parish of Greatham to the south-west, and the Greatham Beck to the west. In 1831, the parish contained the townships of Stranton, Seaton Carew, and Brierton.

The area’s name was last used as an electoral ward name in the 2011 UK Census, with a population of 6,105. It covered most of the town centre with parts of Stranton in the south west of the ward. For the 2015 general election Burn Valley, Headland & Harbour and Victoria replaced the majority of the former ward area.

History

Samuel A. Lewis's A Topographical Dictionary of England (1848) says:

Lewis noted that the parish church was on high ground in the centre of the village and that its tower was a landmark for seamen, and that there was also a Wesleyan Methodist chapel. He reported two benefices, Stranton and Seaton-Carew, and two schools, an almost new National School in the hamlet of Middleton, built in 1840, and a small endowed school in Stranton teaching fifteen children.

In draining a morass at Stranton, a large quantity of human bones was found, which may have been the remains of the Scots killed at the Siege of Hartlepool in 1644.

Notable people
Jack London (1913–1963), boxer
Agnes Rudd (1861–1939), artist
Lt. General Sir William Marshall (1865–1939), soldier

Notes

See also
Stranton Grange Cemetery
Sadberge (wapentake)

Former civil parishes in County Durham
History of Hartlepool